Min Linka  was governor of Pegu (Bago) from 1348 to  1353. Son of King Saw Zein of Martaban, the prince was appointed governor by his half-brother King Binnya U. But he did not help his brother during the 1351–52 invasion of the kingdom by Lan Na. He was defeated by his brother's forces after they had defeated the invasion. Linka was brought back to Martaban, and executed there.

Brief
Born  1327 in Martaban (Mottama), Min Linka was the second child of Queen May Hnin Htapi and King Saw Zein of Martaban. The prince had one full elder sister, Tala Mi Ma-Hsan; two maternal half-siblings, King Saw E (r. 1330) and May Hnin Aw-Kanya; and three paternal half-siblings, Mwei Ne, Princess-Regent Maha Dewi (r. 1383–1384) and King Binnya U (r. 1348–1384).

In 1348, the prince was appointed governor of Pegu (Bago) with the title of Smin Nyi Kaung Thein (သမိန် ညီကောင်သိန်) by Binnya U, who had just ascended the throne. It was an important appointment as the new king, who was still consolidating power, needed someone he could trust in Pegu, located in the geographic center of the Mon-speaking kingdom. The new king also married Linka to Mwei Daw, daughter of Chief Minister Than Bon.

Linka, however, was not loyal to his brother. He did not send any help to U in 1351 when the king faced a major rebellion at Donwun, just 100 km north of Martaban, and half-way between Pegu and Martaban. The rebellion was backed by the eastern Tai-speaking kingdom of Lan Na, which sent an 8000-strong invasion force. The dry season invasion penetrated deep into Martaban territory but the invaders overstretched, and were decisively defeated by U near Martaban. After the victory, U was able to consolidate support amongst his vassals, who wanted to be on the winning side. Linka was now in trouble. He had not consolidated support in the Pegu province itself. In the following dry season of 1352–1353, U sent an army to reclaim Pegu. The operation was successful.

Linka, along with his wife and three children, was brought back to Martaban. At the capital, U took his wife, who became Queen Thiri Maya Dewi, and ordered his execution. Thiri Maya Dewi and U later had a son, the future king Razadarit. U treated Linka's children well. He appointed Linka's only son, Nyi Kan-Kaung, governor of Dala–Twante  1370.

Ancestry
Linka was a grandnephew of the founder of the dynasty King Wareru from his father's side, and a grandson of King Loe Thai of Sukhothai from his mother's side.

Notes

References

Bibliography
 
 
 
 
 

Hanthawaddy dynasty
1320s births
1350s deaths